Ancistrogastrinae is a subfamily of earwigs in the family Forficulidae. There are about 6 genera and more than 30 described species in Ancistrogastrinae.

Genera
These six genera belong to the subfamily Ancistrogastrinae:
 Ancistrogaster Stal, 1855
 Litocosmia Hebard, 1917
 Osteulcus Burr, 1907
 Paracosmia Borelli, 1909
 Praos Burr, 1907
 Sarcinatrix Rehn, 1903

References

Further reading

 
 

Forficulidae